The Skirmish at Paint Rock Bridge was an action fought between a Union Army detachment of 27 men guarding a bridge near Woodville, Alabama and a Confederate States Army cavalry detachment intent on destroying the railroad bridge on April 28, 1862, during the American Civil War. Union Army brigade commander Colonel Joshua W. Sill reported that the men from the 10th Wisconsin Volunteer Infantry Regiment, commanded by Colonel Arnold R. Chapin, who were under the immediate command of Sergeant William Nelson and Sergeant Augustus H. Makimson held off the Confederate force of 250 men for over two hours and killed 7 Confederates and captured 1 wounded Confederate soldier who told the Union men of the Confederate numbers and casualties. The action resulted in the Union maintaining control of an intact railroad line through the area.

References

1862 in the American Civil War
1862 in Alabama
Paint Rock Bridge
Paint Rock Bridge
April 1862 events
Jackson County, Alabama